A statue of Sun Yat-sen was installed in Seattle, in the U.S. state of Washington, in 2018.

References

2018 establishments in Washington (state)
Chinatown–International District, Seattle
Cultural depictions of Sun Yat-sen
Monuments and memorials in Seattle
Monuments and memorials to Sun Yat-sen
Outdoor sculptures in Seattle
Statues in Washington (state)